Jack Knowles (2 February 1932 – 22 July 1996) was an Australian rules footballer in the Victorian Football League (VFL).

Jack Knowles was a full back pocket in the losing Essendon team against Melbourne in the 1957 VFL Grand Final.

References

External links

1932 births
1996 deaths
Essendon Football Club players
Australian rules footballers from Victoria (Australia)
Redan Football Club players